Jacques Dufour (1 July 1930 – 11 November 2020), known by the pen name Jude Stéfan, was a French poet and novelist.

Biography
Stéfan studied law and philosophy. He was a teacher at the Lycée Augustin Fresnel in Bernay where he taught French, Latin, and Greek. Throughout his career, he published numerous novels, essays, and poems.

Awards
Prix Max-Jacob (1985)
Grand prix de Poésie de la Ville de Paris (2000)

Publications

Poetry
Cyprès (1967)
Libères (1970)
Idylles (1973)
Poésie (1978)
Aux chiens du soir : poèmes en titre (1979)
Laures : poèmes (1984)
Litanies du scribe (1984)
Alme Diane (1986)
À la vieille Parque (1989)
Stances : ou 52 contre-haï-ku (1991)
Elégiades (1993)
Prosopopées (1995)
Povrésies ou 65 poèmes autant d’années (1997)
Épodes ou poèmes de la désuétude (1999)
Génitifs (2001)
La Muse Province (2002)
Caprices (2004)
Désespérance, déposition (2006)
Que ne suis-je Catulle (2010)
Disparates (2012)

Novels
Vie de mon frère (1973)
La Crevaison (1976)
Lettres tombales (1983)
Les États du corps (1987)
La Fête de la patronne (1991)
Le nouvelliste (1993)
Scènes dernières : histoires de vie-mort (1995)
Vie de Saint (1998)
Oraisons funestes (2003)
L’Angliciste (2006)
L'idiot de village (2008)

Essays
Gnomiques ou de l’Inconsolation (1985)
Faux journal (1986)
De Catulle : et vingt transcriptions (1990)
Xénies (1992)
Scholies (1992)
Epitomé ou Chrestomathie à l’usage des débutants en littérature (1993)
Senilia (1994)
Variété VI (1995)
Chroniques catoniques (1996)
Silles (1997)
Variété VII (2000)
Pandectes ou le neveu de Bayle (2008)

Other Works
Suites slaves (1983)
Les Accidents (1984)
La Vieille Parque (1984)
Dialogue avec la sœur (1987)
Dialogue des figures (1988)
Les courtisans (1992)
PrOsEMES (1997)
Quatre épodes (1998)
25 lettres d’alphabet (2000)
Litanies du scribe (2001)
Lettre à une morte (2002)
L’Anti-Pédagogue (2003)
Le Sillographe (Diurnal invectif 1997-2003 (2004)
Les Stéfan (2004)
Thanasies (2005)
Jude Stéfan, rencontre avec Tristan Hordé (2005)
Grains & issues (2007)
Les Commourants (2008)
Ménippées. P(r)o(s)ésies (2011)
Factum (2012)

Interview
Stéfan participated in a series of interviews on the CD album L'Usine à muse in 2011. The track he appeared on was titled Je îl(e) déserte.

References

1930 births
2020 deaths
French poets
21st-century French poets
20th-century French poets
French novelists
20th-century French novelists
21st-century French novelists